In music or music theory, an eleventh  is the note eleven scale degrees from the root of a chord and also the interval between the root and the eleventh. The interval can be also described as a compound fourth, spanning an octave plus a fourth.

Since there are only seven degrees in a diatonic scale the eleventh degree is the same as the subdominant.

The eleventh is considered highly dissonant with the major third.

A perfect eleventh is an eleventh which spans exactly 17 semitones.

See also
Eleventh chord
Suspended chord

References

Chord factors
Fourths (music)
Compound intervals